Fissurella crassa, common name the thick keyhole limpet, is a species of sea snail, a marine gastropod mollusk in the family Fissurellidae, the keyhole limpets and slit limpets.

Description
The size of the shell varies between 34 mm and 90 mm.

Distribution
This species occurs in the Central Pacific to Peru and Chile; but not off the Galápagos Islands.

References

External links
 To Biodiversity Heritage Library (59 publications)
 To GenBank (14 nucleotides; 12 proteins)
 To USNM Invertebrate Zoology Mollusca Collection
 To World Register of Marine Species
 

Fissurellidae
Gastropods described in 1822